Hatun Machay (possibly from Quechua hatun big, mach'ay cave) is a rock forest with archaeological remains in Peru. It was declared a National Cultural Heritage by Resolución Directoral No. 944/INC-2010 on May 7, 2010.

References 

Geography of Ancash Region
Archaeological sites in Huánuco Region
Archaeological sites in Peru